Echenique is a surname of Basque origin. Echenique, (spelled Etxenike in standard Basque means "close to the house". Other spelling variants are Echeñique and Etchenique. Notable people with the surname include:

Sport
Karla Echenique, Dominican volleyball player
José Echenique, Venezuelan basketball player
Rafael Echenique, Argentine golfer

Music
Cecilia Echenique, Chilean singer-songwriter.
Benjamín Juárez Echenique, Mexican popular musical conductor
José Miguel "Negro" Piñera Echenique, Chilean musician

Politics
Gertrudis Echenique, Chilean First Lady between 1896 and 1901. Wife of Federico Errázuriz Echaurren
José Rufino Echenique, Peruvian politician. President of Peru from 1851 until 1855
Pablo Echenique Robba, Spanish scientist and politician.
Sebastián Piñera Echenique, Chilean politician, member of the National Renewal (RN)
José Piñera Echenique, Chilean economist

Writers
 Alfredo Bryce Echenique, a Peruvian writer

Basque-language surnames